Wilhelm Haas (4 September 1896 – 11 January 1981) was a German Ambassador to Israel, Turkey, Japan, the Soviet Union, and the Netherlands.

Career
Before becoming an ambassador, Haas, a 1953 graduate of Bowdoin College served as head of  the West German Law of the Sea Delegation at the United Nations, as head of the African Bureau in your country's Foreign Office, and as Assistant Secretary of State dealing with Latin, African, and Asian Affairs.  In 1988, Bowdoin awarded him an honorary doctor of laws degree.

External links
 Youtube : German Ambassador in Moscow (1956)
 Historic Image

Bowdoin College alumni
1896 births
1981 deaths
Ambassadors of West Germany to Israel
Ambassadors of West Germany to Japan
Ambassadors of West Germany to the Netherlands
Knights Commander of the Order of Merit of the Federal Republic of Germany
20th-century German diplomats